The Com-Pac 19 is an American trailerable sailboat, that was designed by Robert K. Johnson and first built in 1979.

Production
The boat was built by Com-Pac Yachts in the United States, from 1979 to 2002, but it is now out of production.

Design

The Com-Pac 19 is a small recreational keelboat, built predominantly of fiberglass, with wood trim. It has a masthead sloop rig, a transom-hung rudder and a fixed long keel. It displaces  and carries  of ballast.

The design is normally fitted with a small  outboard motor for docking and maneuvering. There is a cockpit storage compartment for the outboard's fuel tank.

Accommodations include berths for four people and an optional head located at the bottom of the companionway and a galley located in the notch at the base of the V-berth. Optional equipment includes jibsheet and halyard winches, tracks for the genoa and a pulpit.

Variants
Com-Pac 19
This model was introduced in 1979.
Com-Pac 19 Mk 2
This model was introduced in 1979 and differs from the original model by the addition of a bowsprit that moves the forestay forward.

Operational history
In a 2010 review Steve Henkel wrote, "this design, originally drawn by Island Packet builder/designer Bob Johnson, was gradually changed over her more than 20-year life, but the basics remained the same. Like her little sister, the Com-Pac 16, she was designed to provide easy handling for novice sailors. Best features: Very simple rig and fittings, suitable for first-time sailors. Deep cockpit gives feeling of security. Worst features: The long keel tends to keep her sailing straight ahead, a plus when cruising in gusty weather but a minus when you want to make a quick turn. New price was a bit above most of her comp[etitors]s, and her Space Index is lowest. The keel is not deep enough for efficient upwind sailing, All comp[etitors]s have only sitting headroom, but the Com-Pac has the least of the bunch. A portable galley was available as an option ... though in the latest model the galley was moved forward and enlarged to include sink (with a small water supply) and ice chest. Otherwise, there's not much below."

See also
List of sailing boat types

Similar sailboats
Cornish Shrimper 19
Mariner 19
Mercury 18
Nordica 16
Sanibel 18
West Wight Potter 19

References

External links

Keelboats
1970s sailboat type designs
Sailing yachts
Trailer sailers
Sailboat types built by Com-Pac Yachts
Sailboat type designs by Robert K. Johnson